Sri Lanka is a tropical island situated close to the southern tip of India. The invertebrate fauna is as large as it is common to other regions of the world. There are about two million species of arthropods found in the world, and still is counting.

The following list is about confirmed hemipterans recorded in Sri Lanka, though many new unconfirmed sightings are existent.

Hemipterans
Phylum: Arthropoda
Class: Insecta
Order: Hemiptera

The Hemiptera order of insects includes the insects commonly known as the true bugs. The order includes planthoppers, leafhoppers, shield bugs, cicadas, aphids. More than 70,000 species are distributed worldwide. Most hemipterans are plant sap feeders, some are parasitic, while the rest are predators who attack small insects and small invertebrates. Most species are terrestrial and a few are aquatic. Hemipterans are hemimetabolous, where young are similar to adults in the morphology. Hemipterans are economically important insects, where most of them are agricultural pests and vertebrate parasites.

The following list provide the hemipterans currently identified in Sri Lanka. Sri Lanka is known to be home for 794 species of hemipterans included to 71 families. Detailed work of Sri Lankan hemipterans are recorded in book Catalogue of Hemiptera of Sri Lanka. Sri Lanka comprises 74 species in 46 genera and 6 families of aphids within order Hemiptera. Two endemic aphid species found on Sri Lanka. Many researches have been carried out by different hemipteran families by local and overseas experts.

In 2009, M. Prashanthini and M. Vinobaba of Eastern University of Sri Lanka carried out experiments on mealybugs and identified 38 species of mealybugs from Sri Lanka with new exotic species. Un updated systematic catalogue of cicadas of South Asia have been published in 2016. According to that, 22 species of cicadas were recorded from Sri Lanka. Chopra and Rustagi in 2012 published the characters of the subfamily Chauliopinae from India and Sri Lanka.

In 2012, B. Vasantharaj David compiled the checklist and diversity of whiteflies of Sri Lanka with new records of seven species and new Pealius species from Sri Lanka. Fourteen species belonging to eight genera of soft scales were identified with two introduced species from Sri Lanka. The provisional checklist of the Leafhoppers in Sri Lanka have been compiled by Dr. Rajendramani Gnaneswaran of the Department of Zoology, University of Jaffna. With her revision, 257 leafhopper species belonging to 120 genera have been identified from Sri Lanka.

Family: Achilidae - achilid planthoppers
 Akotropis malayana 
 Callinesia fimbriolata 
 Caristianus indicus 
 Chroneba pallifrons 
 Epirama conspergata 
 Gordiacea oculata 
 Indorupex albivenulosa 
 Magadha nebulosa 
 Paratangia marginata 
 Paratangia notata 
 Tangina bipunctata

Family: Aclerdidae - aclerdid scales
 Aclerda distorta

Family: Adelgidae - spruce aphids
 Pseudophacopteron floccosa

Family: Aleyrodidae - whiteflies

 Aleurocanthus citriperdus
 Aleurocanthus ficicola 
 Aleurocanthus martini 
 Aleurocanthus niger 
 Aleurocanthus nigricans 
 Aleurocanthus piperis 
 Aleurocanthus spiniferus
 Aleurocanthus woglumi
 Aleuroclava selvakumarani 
 Aleuroclava srilankaensis 
 Aleurodicus antidesmae 
 Aleurolobus flavus
 Aleurolobus greeni 
 Aleurolobus marlatti 
 Aleurolobus setigerus
 Aleuroplatus incisus
 Aleuroplatus pectiniferus
 Aleuroplatus premnae 
 Aleuroplatus spina 
 Aleurotrachelus longispinus
 Aleyrodes hyperici 
 Bemisia tabaci
 Crescentaleyrodes semilunaris 
 Dialeurodes citri 
 Dialeurodes decempuncta
 Dialeurodes dissimilis 
 Dialeurodes ixorae 
 Dialeurodes loranthi 
 Dialeurodes radiilinealis
 Dialeurodes radiipuncta
 Dialeurolonga maculata 
 Dialeuropora decempuncta
 Laingiella bambusae 
 Minutaleyrodes minuta 
 Neomaskellia andropogonis 
 Orientaleyrodes zeylanicus 
 Pealius nelsoni 
 Rhachisphora capitatis 
 Rhachisphora rutherfordi
 Rhachisphora setulosa 
 Rhachisphora trilobitoides
 Tetraleurodes psidii 
 Tetraleurodes rugosus 
 Vasdavidius setiferus 
 Zaphanera cyanotis

Family: Alydidae - broad-headed bugs
 Dulichius inflatus

Family: Aphalaridae
 Ctenarytaina eucalypti

Family: Aphididae

Family: Aphrophoridae - spittlebugs 
 Clovia lineatocollis
 Poophilus costalis 
 Ptyelus declaratus

Family: Aradidae - flat bugs
 Aneurus greeni 
 Mezira membranacea 
 Neuroctenus hyalinipennis
 Singhalaptera secunda
 Signocoris nilgiricus

Family: Asterolecaniidae - pit scales
 Amorphococcus mesuae 
 Asterolecanium bella 
 Asterolecanium coronatum 
 Asterolecanium epidendri 
 Asterolecanium miliaris
 Bambusaspis bambusae 
 Bambusaspis delicatum 
 Bambusaspis longa 
 Bambusaspis longum 
 Bambusaspis miliaris 
 Bambusaspis pseudomiliaris 
 Bambusaspis solenophoroides 
 Polea ceylonica

Family: Belostomatidae - giant water bugs
 Diplonychus rusticus
 Lethocerus indicus

Family: Berytidae - stilt bugs
 Metacanthus pulchellus

Family: Caliscelidae - piglet bugs
 Chirodisca eximia 
 Lasonia kirkaldyi 
 Pterilia ceylonensis 
 Pterilia piceata 
 Pterilia signata 
 Pterygoma nasuta 
 Symplana viridinervis

Family: Calophyidae 
 Calophya spondiasae

Family: Carsidaridae 
 Leptynoptera lanka
 Mesohomotoma lutheri 
 Tenaphalara acutipennis

Family: Cercopidae - froghoppers
 Caloscarta capitata 
 Caloscarta pallescens 
 Cosmoscarta affinis 
 Cosmoscarta egeria 
 Cosmoscarta greeni 
 Cosmoscarta heroina
 Cosmoscarta inconspicua 
 Cosmoscarta taprobanensis
 Eoscarta apicata 
 Homalostethus tennanti 
 Leptataspis inclusa 
 Rhinastria bicolor

Family: Cerococcidae - ornate pit scales
 Cerococcus albospicatus
 Cerococcus indicus
 Cerococcus koebelei 
 Cerococcus ornatus 
 Cerococcus roseus

Family: Cicadellidae - leafhoppers

 Acacimenus zeylonicus
 Aconura colombensis
 Acostemma walkeri
 Agallia biplagiata
 Aidola erota 
 Aidola orbata 
 Alebroides bidens
 Amrasca apicoserrata
 Amrasca biguttula
 Amrasca bombaxia 
 Amrasca pringlei
 Amrasca splendens
 Amritodus atkinsoni
 Anatkina helena 
 Apheliona bioculata
 Asepodiva ihana  
 Austroagallia nitobei 
 Baguoidea rufa 
 Balbillus granulosus
 Balclutha punctata
 Balclutha rubrostriatus
 Balocha astutus
 Banus oblatus 
 Batracomorphus chlorophana
 Batracomorphus indica
 Batracomorphus piceatus
 Bhatia distanti
 Bhatia olivaceus 
 Calodia ostentus
 Calodia paraostenta
 Carvaka dolens 
 Cerkira angusta
 Cestius sellatus 
 Changwhania ceylonensis
 Chatura nigella 
 Chiasmus uzelii
 Cicadula vaga 
 Coelidia atkinsoni
 Confucius bituberculatus
 Cubnara currax 
 Deltocephalus fuscovarius
 Deltocephalus rufolineatus
 Deltocephalus scriptus
 Deltocephalus transparipennis
 Deltocephalus variegatus
 Destinoides latifrons
 Diomma ochracea
 Divus bipunctatus
 Doratulina laetus
 Doratulina solitaris
 Doratulina verticus
 Dorycnia funeta
 Dorycnia melichari
 Dorycnia mirabilis
 Drabescus angulatus
 Drabescus conspicuus
 Drabescus stramineus
 Dussana quaerenda 
 Empoasca amasa
 Empoasca cona
 Empoasca kudlata
 Empoasca lautereri
 Empoasca malliki 
 Empoasca motti 
 Empoasca spirosa 
 Empoasca tanova
 Empoasca triangularis 
 Empoascanara cilla
 Empoascanara fumigata 
 Empoascanara maculifrons
 Empoascanara nigrobimaculata
 Empoascanara prima
 Empoascanara regularis
 Empoascanara sathyamangalamensis
 Empoascanara sordida
 Eogypona kirbyi
 Eutettix apricus
 Exitianus capicola 
 Exitianus fusconervosus 
 Gambialoa cellularis
 Gambialoa finita
 Gambialoa nigra
 Gambialoa stubbsi
 Glossocratus greeni
 Goniagnathus nervosus
 Goniagnathus punctifer
 Gunghuyana cingalensis 
 Haranga scutellaris
 Hecalus nervosus
 Heliona constricta
 Helionides exsultans
 Hishimonus apricus
 Hishimonus arcuatus
 Hishimonus discigutta
 Hishimonus dividens
 Hishimonus nielsoni
 Homa haematoptila 
 Idioscopus nigroclypeatus
 Idioscopus niveosparsus
 Ifuaria pallida
 Ifugoa media
 Igerna bimaculicollis 
 Jacobiasca boninensis
 Jacobiasca formosana
 Jacobiasca lybica
 Jacobiasca melichari
 Jacobiasca renschi
 Jassargus infirmus 
 Kamaza sadakorni
 Kana decora 
 Kana fasciata
 Kana ordinata 
 Kana ramificata 
 Kana thoracica 
 Kapsa cerna 
 Kapsa vana 
 Koperta nidogra
 Krisna kirbyi 
 Kutara brunnescens
 Kutara transversa 
 Lampridius spectabilis
 Lankama pringeli
 Lankasca centromaculata
 Lectotypella rawa
 Ledra cingalensis
 Ledra dilatata 
 Ledra intermedia
 Ledra rugosa 
 Ledra sublata 
 Ledropsis obligens
 Ledropsis producta
 Ledropsis punctulata
 Ledropsis singalensis
 Leofa curtulus
 Linnavuoriella arcuatus
 Litura unda 
 Macropsis ceylonica
 Malichus capitatus
 Matsumurina communis
 Megabyzus signandus
 Mimotettix albomaculatus
 Mimotettix lateralis
 Mizeria chimera
 Molopopterus ni
 Motschulskyia inspirata
 Motschulskyia serrata
 Mukaria penthimioides  
 Nehela atrovenosa
 Neoaliturus guttulatus
 Neodartus acocephaloides
 Neodartus rufopunctatus
 Neodartus scutellatus
 Nephotettix malayanus 
 Nephotettix nigropicta
 Nephotettix parvus
 Nephotettix sympatricus
 Niedoida atrifrons
 Nimabanana rawana 
 Parallygus divaricatus
 Paramesodes matalae
 Pedioscopus unimaculatus
 Penthimia erebus
 Penthimia juno 
 Penthimia melanocephala
 Penthimia vittatifrons
 Periacerus lankensis
 Petalocephala bicolor
 Petalocephala chlorocephala
 Petalocephala confusa
 Petalocephala conica
 Petalocephala glauca
 Petalocephala nigrilinea
 Petalocephala perductalis
 Petalocephala remota
 Petalocephala tabulata
 Petalocephala uniformis
 Petalocephala walkeri
 Platyretus marginatus
 Pratura ceylona
 Preta gratiosa 
 Pythamus dealbatus 
 Qadria rubronotata
 Rawania petasata
 Recilia dorsalis 
 Recilia elongatoocellatus
 Recilia intermedius 
 Scaphoideus elegantalus
 Scaphoideus festivus
 Scaphoideus fletcheri
 Scaphoideus morosus
 Scaphoideus notatus
 Scaphoideus ornatus
 Scaphoideus punctulatus
 Scaphoideus sculptellus
 Seriana jaina 
 Seriana sagara
 Signoretia greeni
 Sikkimasca annulata 
 Tambila conspersa
 Tambila fletcheri
 Tambila greeni 
 Tambila opulenta
 Tautoneura tripunctula
 Thagria brincki 
 Thagria fasciata
 Thagria fryeri 
 Thagria introducta
 Thagria luridus
 Thagria signata 
 Thagria simulata
 Thagria srilankensis
 Thaia drutoidea
 Thaia lankaensis
 Thaia perfecta
 Thaia subrufa
 Thaia vulgaris
 Thamnotettix cicur
 Thamnotettix greeni
 Thamnotettix latruncularius
 Thomsoniella apicalis
 Tituria planata
 Trifida melichari 
 Ujna delicatula 
 Ujna exigua 
 Ujna gagatina 
 Uzeldikra citrina
 Uzelina laticeps 
 Vulturnus ornatus
 Vulturnus speciosus 
 Xestocephalus apicalis
 Xestocephalus guttulatus
 Xestocephalus paganurus 
 Znana notata 
 Zyginella insecata 
 Zyginella pulchra 
 Zyginella vietnamica
 Zyginopsis horizontalis
 Zyginopsis verticalis

Family: Cixiidae - cixiid planthoppers

 Andes elongatus 
 Andes geometrinus 
 Andes meander 
 Andes nubilus 
 Brixia tortriciformis 
 Cixius pilifer 
 Eucarpia arcuigera 
 Eucarpia fasciata 
 Eucarpia insignis 
 Indolipa greeni 
 Kirbyana pagana 
 Mundopa balteata 
 Mundopa cingalensis 
 Mundopa dohertyi 
 Mundopa greeni 
 Mundopa sita 
 Oliarus cingalensis 
 Oliarus distanti 
 Oliarus nuwarae 
 Oliarus stigma 
 Oliarus tabrobanensis 
 Oliparisca pundaloyensis

Family: Coccidae - soft scales

 Ceronema fryeri 
 Ceronema koebeli 
 Ceroplastes actiniformis 
 Ceroplastes destructor
 Ceroplastes dugesii
 Ceroplastes floridensis
 Ceroplastes pseudoceriferus
 Ceroplastes rubens
 Ceroplastes sinensis
 Coccus antidesmae 
 Coccus asiaticus 
 Coccus capparidis  
 Coccus discrepans 
 Coccus formicarii 
 Coccus gymnospori 
 Coccus hesperidum
 Coccus hesperidum 
 Coccus illuppalamae 
 Coccus latioperculatum 
 Coccus litzeae 
 Coccus longulus
 Coccus ophiorrhizae 
 Coccus viridis
 Cribrolecanium formicarum 
 Ctenochiton cinnamomi 
 Ctenochiton fryeri 
 Ctenochiton olivaceum
 Dicyphococcus castilloae 
 Drepanococcus cajani 
 Drepanococcus chiton 
 Drepanococcus virescens 
 Eucalymnatus tessellatus 
 Inglisia chelonioides 
 Kilifia acuminate
 Maacoccus arundinariae 
 Maacoccus bicruciatus 
 Maacoccus piperis subsp. namunakuli 
 Marsipococcus iceryoides 
 Marsipococcus marsupialis 
 Megapulvinaria maxima 
 Membranaria ceylonica 
 Milviscutulus mangiferae 
 Neolecanium cinnamomi 
 Neolecanium pseudoleae 
 Neoplatylecanium tripartitum 
 Paralecanium calophylli
 Paralecanium geometricum 
 Paralecanium limbatum 
 Paralecanium mancum 
 Paralecanium marginatum 
 Paralecanium maritimum 
 Paralecanium paradeniyense 
 Paralecanium planum 
 Paralecanium quadratum 
 Paralecanium trifasciatum 
 Paralecanium zonatum 
 Parasaissetia nigra
 Platylecanium fusiforme 
 Platysaissetia crustuliforme 
 Prococcus acutissimus
 Protopulvinaria longivalvata 
 Pulvinaria ixorae 
 Pulvinaria polygonata
 Pulvinaria psidii
 Pulvinaria tenuivalvata
 Pulvinaria tessellata 
 Pulvinaria tomentosa 
 Pulvinaria urbicola 
 Saissetia coffeae
 Saissetia privigna 
 Tectopulvinaria farinose
 Vinsonia stellifera

Family: Conchaspididae - false armored scales
 Conchaspis socialis

Family: Coreidae - squash bugs
 Mictis longicornis

Family: Corixidae - water boatmen
 Micronecta anatolica 
 Micronecta grisea 
 Micronecta quadristrigata
 Sigara scutellaris 
 Synaptonecta issa

Family: Cydnidae - burrowing bugs
 Aethus indicus 
 Cydnus aterrimus 
 Fromundus pygmaeus

Family: Cymidae 
 Cymodema basicornis
 Cymoninus sechellensis 
 Ontiscus vitiensis

Family: Dactylopiidae - cochineals
 Dactylopius ceylonicus
 Dactylopius confusus
 Dactylopius opuntiae 
 Planococcus lilacinus

Family: Delphacidae - delphacid planthoppers

 Altekon charcamis 
 Anectopia mandane
 Arcofacies truncatipennis 
 Cemus granulinervis 
 Cemus pulchellus 
 Cemus sauteri  
 Eodelphax serendiba 
 Epeurysa nawaii 
 Epeurysa stigma 
 Euconon astarte 
 Euidellana celadon 
 Falcotoya citipes
 Hagamiodes meator 
 Harmalia anacharsis 
 Harmalia heitensis subsp. otho
 Harmalia tarasco 
 Harmalia thoracica 
 Harmalia tiphys 
 Horcoma colorata 
 Indozuriel samiator
 Matutinus melichari 
 Metadelphax propinqua 
 Nanotoya alboguttata 
 Necodan zimara 
 Nilaparvata bakeri 
 Nilaparvata chaeremon 
 Nilaparvata lugens
 Nothokalpa salome 
 Nycheuma cognatum 
 Opiconsiva albicollis 
 Opiconsiva dodona 
 Paranda globiceps 
 Peliades nigropunctatus  
 Peregrinus simplicia 
 Phacalastor anaxarete 
 Rhombotoya pseudonigripennis
 Sardia pluto 
 Sardia rostrata 
 Smicrotatodelphax iota 
 Smicrotatodelphax maenobora 
 Smicrotatodelphax stasander 
 Sogata vatrenus 
 Sogatella furcifera 
 Sogatella kolophon 
 Sogatodes candiope 
 Sogatodes sternalis 
 Stenocranus oroba 
 Stenocranus polenor 
 Syndelphax agametor 
 Syndelphax disonymos 
 Syndelphax euonymus 
 Syndelphax euroclydon 
 Tagosodes pusanus 
 Terthron albomarginatum 
 Toya attenuata 
 Toya beninu 
 Toya cularo 
 Toya larymna 
 Toya minutula 
 Toya peruda 
 Toya siaka 
 Toya tuberculosa 
 Tropidocephala brunnipennis
 Tropidocephala festiva 
 Tropidocephala saccharivorella
 Tropidocephala serendiba 
 Ulanar muiri

Family: Derbidae - derbid planthoppers

 Alara obscura 
 Archara typica 
 Banksiella elegantula 
 Derbe crenatonervosa 
 Helcita nitagalensis 
 Interamma rubrofasciata 
 Kamendaka fuscofasciata 
 Kamendaka maculosa 
 Kamendaka maskeliyae 
 Kamendaka spectra 
 Kamendaka vittata 
 Lydda aatralis 
 Neozoraida fletcheri 
 Neozoraida gilva 
 Neozoraida motschoulskyi 
 Neozoraida obsoleta 
 Pamendanga distanti 
 Pamendanga punctativentris 
 Perandenina typica 
 Phra amplificata 
 Proutista furcatovittata 
 Rhotana albata 
 Rhotana fuscofasciata 
 Rhotana stali 
 Rhotana trimaculata 
 Rhotana vitriceps 
 Robigus sanguineus 
 Saccharodite basipunctulata
 Saccharodite iridipennis 
 Sumangala delicatula 
 Vekunta tenella 
 Vinata nigricornis 
 Zoraida ceylonica 
 Zoraida egregia 
 Zoraida ficta 
 Zoraida kirkaldyi 
 Zoraida lankana 
 Zoraida pterophoroides 
 Zoraida rufivena

Family: Diaspididae - armored scale insects

 Abgrallaspis cyanophylli 
 Adiscofiorinia atalantiae
 Adiscofiorinia secreta
 Andaspis antidesmae
 Andaspis hawaiiensis
 Andaspis vandae 
 Aonidia crenulata
 Aonidia echinata
 Aonidia loranthi 
 Aonidia mimusopis
 Aonidia obscura
 Aonidia perplexa
 Aonidia planchoniodes
 Aonidia planchonioides
 Aonidia pusilla
 Aonidia spatulata 
 Aonidiella citrina
 Aonidiella orientalis
 Aonidiella pothi
 Aonidiella taxus
 Aonidomytilus albus
 Aspidiella panici
 Aspidiella sacchari
 Aspidiotus destructor
 Aspidiotus excisus
 Aspidiotus nerii 
 Aspidiotus putearius
 Aulacaspis bambusae
 Aulacaspis calcarata
 Aulacaspis elaeagni
 Aulacaspis fagraeae
 Aulacaspis fagreae
 Aulacaspis hedyotidis
 Aulacaspis heneratgoda
 Aulacaspis herbae
 Aulacaspis litzeae
 Aulacaspis loranthi
 Aulacaspis madiunensis
 Aulacaspis orientalis
 Aulacaspis phoenicis
 Aulacaspis tubercularis
 Aulacaspis uncinati 
 Bigymnaspis bullata
 Chionaspis saitamaensis
 Chrysomphalus aonidum
 Chrysomphalus dictyospermi
 Chrysomphalus pinnulifer 
 Circulaspis canaliculata 
 Contigaspis coimbatorensis 
 Contigaspis cyanogena 
 Coronaspis coronifera 
 Cryptophyllaspis elongata 
 Cryptophyllaspis occulta 
 Diaspis antiquorum 
 Diaspis boisduvalii 
 Diaspis mihiriya 
 Diaspis myristicae 
 Dinaspis dilatilobis 
 Duplachionaspis divergens 
 Duplachionaspis graminis 
 Duplaspidiotus claviger 
 Duplaspidiotus fossor 
 Duplaspidiotus quadriclavatus 
 Duplaspidiotus tesseratus 
 Fiorinia bidens 
 Fiorinia fioriniae 
 Fiorinia gelonii 
 Fiorinia japonica 
 Fiorinia kandyensis 
 Fiorinia odinae 
 Fiorinia pinicola 
 Fiorinia proboscidaria 
 Fiorinia similis 
 Fiorinia taiwana 
 Fiorinia theae 
 Fiorinia tumida 
 Fiorinia turpiniae 
 Froggattiella inusitata 
 Froggattiella penicillata 
 Furcaspis biformis 
 Furchadaspis zamiae 
 Genaparlatoria pseudaspidiotus 
 Gomphaspidiotus cuculus 
 Greenaspis arundinariae 
 Greenaspis elongata 
 Greeniella columnifera 
 Greeniella cornigera 
 Greeniella ferreae 
 Greeniella mesuae 
 Greenoidea phyllanthi 
 Gymnaspis spinomarginata 
 Hemiberlesia lataniae 
 Hemiberlesia palmae 
 Hemiberlesia rapax 
 Howardia biclavis 
 Insulaspis lasianthi 
 Ischaspis longirostris 
 Ischnaspis longirostris  
 Kuwanaspis linearis
 Ledaspis atalantiae 
 Lepidosaphes ambigua 
 Lepidosaphes beckii 
 Lepidosaphes cocculi 
 Lepidosaphes gloverii 
 Lepidosaphes pallidula 
 Lepidosaphes piperis 
 Lepidosaphes rubrovittata 
 Lepidosaphes tokionis 
 Lindingaspis fusca 
 Lindingaspis greeni 
 Lindingaspis mackenziei 
 Lindingaspis rossi 
 Lopholeucaspis cockerelli 
 Lopholeucaspis limoniae 
 Morganella longispina 
 Mycetaspis personata 
 Nudachaspis fodiens
 Octaspidiotus calophylli 
 Odonaspis greenii 
 Odonaspis panici 
 Odonaspis ruthae
 Odonaspis saccharicaulis
 Odonaspis secreta 
 Odonaspis serrata 
 Parachionaspis galliformens 
 Paraonidia malleola
 Paraonidia melleola 
 Parlatoria aonidiformis
 Parlatoria atalantiae
 Parlatoria cingala
 Parlatoria cingali 
 Parlatoria cinnamomi
 Parlatoria mesuae
 Parlatoria mytilaspiformis
 Parlatoria mytilaspisformis 
 Parlatoria namunakuli
 Parlatoria oleae 
 Parlatoria phyllanthi
 Parlatoria proteus 
 Parlatoria rutherfordi
 Parlatoria serrula 
 Parlatoria ziziphi
 Pinnaspis alatae
 Pinnaspis albizziae
 Pinnaspis aspidastrae 
 Pinnaspis buxi 
 Pinnaspis dracaenae
 Pinnaspis exercitata
 Pinnaspis muntingi
 Pinnaspis mussaendae
 Pinnaspis rhododendri
 Pinnaspis scrobicularum
 Pinnaspis strachani 
 Pinnaspis theae 
 Poliaspoides formosana 
 Porogymnaspis mesochitinosa
 Proceraspis cinnamomi
 Pseudaonidia irrepta
 Pseudaonidia trilobitiformis
 Pseudaulacaspis barberi
 Pseudaulacaspis cockerelli 
 Pseudaulacaspis ernesti 
 Pseudaulacaspis eugeniae 
 Pseudaulacaspis gynandropsidis
 Pseudaulacaspis megaloba 
 Pseudaulacaspis polygoni
 Pseudaulacaspis simplex 
 Pseudaulacaspis strobilanthi
 Pseudaulacaspis subcorticalis
 Pseudaulacaspis tenera
 Pseudaulacaspis varicosa
 Pseudoparlatoria ostreata 
 Pseudoparlatoria serrulata
 Quernaspis quercus
 Rutherfordia major
 Rutherfordia malloti 
 Selenaspidus articulatus
 Semelaspidus ambalangoda
 Semelaspidus artocarpi 
 Tenuiaspis minuta
 Trullifiorinia rubrolineata
 Trullifiorinia scrobicularum 
 Unaspis acuminata 
 Unaspis atricolor 
 Unaspis flava 
 Unaspis permutans

Family: Dictyopharidae - dictyopharid planthoppers
 Avephora brachycephala
 Dichoptera hampsoni 
 Dictyopharina viridissima 
 Orthopagus splendens 
 Pibrocha egregia 
 Putala rostrata 
 Truncatomeria viridistigma

Family: Dinidoridae 
 Coridius janus 
 Cyclopelta obscura

Family: Eriococcidae - felt scales
 Eriococcus araucariae subsp. araucariae
 Eriococcus bambusae 
 Eriococcus nuerae 
 Eriococcus osbeckiae 
 Eriococcus rhodomyrti 
 Eriococcus tenuis 
 Eriococcus transversus
 Lachnodiopsis humboldtiae

Family: Eurybrachidae 
 Nicidus fusconebulosus

Family: Flatidae - flatid planthoppers
 Adelidoria pulverulenta
 Anaya conflicta 
 Anaya proxima 
 Flata argiolus 
 Flata ferrugata 
 Gomeda abdominalis 
 Hilavrita fatua 
 Ketumala nigropunctata 
 Melicharia conflicta 
 Melicharia limbatus 
 Ormenoides pehlkei 
 Satapa sicula

Family: Fulgoridae - lanternflies
 Kalidasa sanguinalis
 Laternaria maculata 
 Laternaria oculata 
 Omalocephala festiva
 Polydictya pantherina 
 Pyrops maculatus subsp. fulvirostris
 Zanna dohrni

Family: Geocoridae - big-eyed bugs
 Geocoris ochropterus

Family: Gerridae - water striders
 Neogerris parvulus 
 Rhagadotarsus kraepelini

Family: Halimococcidae - pupillarial palm scales
 Colobopyga kewensis

Family: Issidae - issid planthoppers
 Gergithus bipustulatus subsp. brunneus
 Gergithus dubius 
 Gergithus schaumi 
 Narayana rusticitatis 
 Narayana testudo 
 Pavelauterum fusculum 
 Sarima cretata 
 Sarima elongata 
 Sarima illibata

Family: Kerriidae - lac insects
 Kerria albizziae 
 Kerria lacca 
 Metatachardia conchiferata
 Paratachardina lobata

Family: Kinnaridae - kinnarid planthoppers
 Kinnara ceylonica

Family: Largidae - bordered plant bugs
 Ochterus marginatus

Family: Lecanodiaspididae - false pit scales
 Anomalococcus crematogastri
 Cosmococcus mimusopis 
 Lecanodiaspis malaboda 
 Stictacanthus azadirachtae

Family: Liviidae 
 Diaphorina citri
 Paurocephala psylloptera

Family: Lophopidae 
 Pyrilla aberrans subsp. aberrans
 Pyrilla perpusilla subsp. singhalensis

Family: Lygaeidae - milkweed bugs
 Arocatus continctus 
 Graptostethus servus
 Lygaeus quadratomaculatus 
 Macropes privus 
 Pachyphylegyas modigliani 
 Spilostethus hospes

Family: Machaerotidae - tube spittlebugs
 Machaeropsis valida 
 Machaerota punctatonervosa 
 Soa flaviterminata

Family: Malcidae 
 Chauliops lobatula

Family: Meenoplidae 
 Kermesia albida 
 Nisia campbelli 
 Phaconeura fletcheri 
 Suva albiplaga

Family: Membracidae - typical treehoppers

 Anchon brevis 
 Anchon dirce 
 Anchon pilosus
 Anchon rectangulatus 
 Bathoutha indicans 
 Bocchar incultus 
 Bocchar nuwarana 
 Bocchar pallescens 
 Centrotus angustulus 
 Centrotus bioculatus 
 Centrotus granulatus 
 Centrotus kelloggi
 Centrotus ramosus
 Coccosterphus minuta 
 Coccosterphus obscurus
 Cryptaspidia ferrugata
 Cryptaspidia piceola 
 Emphusis obesus
 Eucoccosterphus mucronicollis 
 Eucoccosterphus tuberculatus 
 Gargara apicata 
 Gargara extrema
 Gargara flavolineata 
 Gargara mixtus 
 Gargara sericea
 Gargara tumida 
 Hemicentrus aculeata
 Hypsauchenia hardwickii
 Indicopleustes albomaculatus
 Indicopleustes curvatus
 Leptocentrus leucaspis
 Leptocentrus reponens
 Leptocentrus substitutus
 Leptocentrus taurus
 Leptocentrus terminalis
 Leptocentrus ustus 
 Maarbarus bubalus 
 Maguva horrida 
 Maguva typicus 
 Otinotus indicatus 
 Otinotus oneratus
 Oxyrhachis crinitus 
 Oxyrhachis fuscicornis
 Oxyrhachis inermis 
 Oxyrhachis taranda 
 Oxyrhachis uncata 
 Parapogon insignis 
 Parapogon kandyiana 
 Pogon albosignatum 
 Pogon atricoxis 
 Pogon auriculatus 
 Pogon cupreus 
 Pogon ferrugineus 
 Pogon incurvatum
 Pogontypus complicatus
 Pogontypus dissimilis
 Pogontypus horvathi
 Postanomus reticulatus 
 Telingana curvispinus
 Telingana decipiens
 Telingana flavipes 
 Telingana imitator 
 Tricentrus basalis 
 Tricentrus kamaonensis 
 Xiphopoeus vomeris
 Yasa greeni

Family: Miridae - plant bugs
 Argenis incisuratus 
 Bertsa lankana
 Campylomma lividum 
 Cyrtorhinus lividipennis 
 Dolichomiris linearis 
 Hallodapus albofasciatus
 Halticus bractatus 
 Moissonia punctata 
 Opuna annulata 
 Pilophorus typicus 
 Prodromus clypeatus 
 Singhalesia obscuricornis 
 Sthenaridea piceonigra 
 Trigonotylus tenuis 
 Tytthus chinensis

Family: Monophlebidae - giant scales
 Drosicha quadricaudata
 Drosicha variegata
 Hemaspidoproctus cinereus 
 Hemaspidoproctus euphorbiae
 Hemaspidoproctus senex
 Icerya aegyptiaca
 Icerya pilosa
 Icerya purchasi 
 Labioproctus poleii
 Neogreenia zeylanica
 Nietnera pundaluoya
 Perissopneumon phyllanthi
 Walkeriana compacta
 Walkeriana floriger
 Walkeriana furcatus
 Walkeriana ovilla

Family: Naucoridae - creeping water bugs 
 Diaphorocoris punctatissimus 
 Naucoris congrex 
 Pelocoris femoratus

Family: Nepidae - waterscorpions
 Laccotrephes griseus
 Laccotrephes simulatus
 Ranatra elongata
 Ranatra filiformis
 Ranatra longipes
 Ranatra sordidula
 Ranatra varipes

Family: Ochteridae - velvety shore bugs
 Ochterus marginatus

Family: Ortheziidae - ensign scales 
 Insignorthezia insignis

Family: Oxycarenidae 
 Oxycarenus bicolor 
 Oxycarenus laetus 
 Oxycarenus lugubris

Family: Pachygronthidae 
 Pachygrontha bipunctata 
 Pachygrontha nigrovittata

Family: Pentatomidae - stink bugs
 Bagrada hilaris
 Catacanthus incarnatus 
 Eysarcoris guttigerus 
 Menida formosa 
 Nezara viridula
 Spermatodes variolosus

Family: Plataspidae 
 Brachyplatys subaeneus

Family: Pseudococcidae - mealybugs

 Antonina maritima 
 Antonina zonata
 Antoninoides parrotti 
 Brevennia pulveraria
 Chaetococcus bambusae 
 Chorizococcus kandyensis
 Coccidohystrix insolita 
 Dysmicoccus aciculus 
 Dysmicoccus brevipes 
 Dysmicoccus carens
 Dysmicoccus finitimus 
 Dysmicoccus neobrevipes 
 Erioides cuneiformis
 Erioides rimulae 
 Farinococcus formicarii
 Farinococcus simplicior
 Ferrisia malvastra 
 Ferrisia virgata 
 Geococcus coffeae
 Geococcus radicum 
 Lachnodiopsis humboldtiae
 Lankacoccus ornatus 
 Maconellicoccus hirsutus
 Nipaecoccus viridis
 Paracoccus citri
 Paracoccus marginatus
 Paracoccus minor
 Pedronia strobilanthis
 Pedronia tenuispina 
 Phenacoccus solenopsis
 Planococcus lilacinus 
 Pseudantonina bambusae 
 Pseudococcus cryptus 
 Pseudococcus debregeasiae
 Pseudococcus longispinus
 Pseudococcus monticola
 Pseudococcus neomaritimus
 Pseudococcus scrobicularum
 Pseudococcus viburni 
 Rastrococcus biggeri
 Rastrococcus iceryoides
 Rastrococcus invadens 
 Rastrococcus mangiferae 
 Rastrococcus taprobanicus
 Rhizoecus bacorum 
 Saccharicoccus sacchari 
 Trionymus bambusae

Family: Psyllidae - jumping plant lice
 Euphalerus isitis 
 Heteropsylla cubana

Family: Pyrrhocoridae - cotton stainers
 Melamphaus rubidus

Family: Rhyparochromidae - seed bugs
 Pachybrachius pacificus
 Paromius gracilis

Family: Saldidae - shore bugs
 Saldoida armata

Family: Scutelleridae - jewel bugs
 Chrysocoris stockerus
 Chrysocoris stollii 
 Hotea curculionoides
 Scutellera perplexa

Family: Tettigometridae 
 Egropa inusta

Family: Tingidae - lace bugs

 Abdastartus atrus 
 Aconchus urbanus
 Agramma ambiguum
 Agramma carinatum
 Agramma danielssoni
 Agramma gibbum
 Agramma sedale
 Baeochila dehrana
 Celantia vagans
 Cochlochila nilgiriensis
 Cysteochila taprobanes
 Cysteochila tingoides
 Diconocoris distanti
 Diconocoris greeni
 Dulinius conchatus
 Habrochila darthula
 Haedus cinghalensis
 Hegesidemus anderssoni
 Hegesidemus eliyanus
 Hurdchila mira
 Lasiacantha cuneata
 Paracopium cingalense
 Paracopium lewisi
 Phatnoma laciniata
 Sinalda coronata
 Stephanitis suffusa
 Stephanitis typica
 Urentius euonymus
 Urentius hystricellus

Family: Triozidae - jumping plant lice
 Baeoalitriozus obsoletus
 Pauropsylla depressa 
 Trioza cinnamomi 
 Trioza obsoleta 
 Trioza vitiensis

Family: Tropiduchidae 
 Leusaba rufitarsis 
 Paruzelia psyllomorpha 
 Paruzelia salome 
 Tambinia languida 
 Varma tridens

Family: Ulopidae 
 Mesargus subopacus

References

 
.Sri Lanka
Hemiptera
Sri Lanka